"Hey Donna" is a single from Rythm Syndicate's eponymous 1991 debut album.  The song reached number 13 on the Billboard Hot 100.

Chart performance

References

1991 singles
Rythm Syndicate songs
1991 songs
Song articles with missing songwriters